Season in Salzburg is a 1952 Austrian musical film directed by Ernst Marischka and starring Johanna Matz, Adrian Hoven, and Walter Müller. It is based on the operetta  by Fred Raymond, Kurt Feltz and Max Wallner. It depicts a number of misunderstandings during the musical season in Salzburg.

Cast

References

External links

1952 films
1952 musical comedy films
Austrian musical comedy films
1950s German-language films
Films directed by Ernst Marischka
Films set in hotels
Films based on operettas
Films scored by Fred Raymond
Austrian black-and-white films